Melkote Manja is a 2017 Indian Kannada-language comedy drama film written, enacted and directed by Jaggesh. This is the third film featuring Jaggesh as Manja after Eddelu Manjunatha (2009) and Manjunatha BA LLB (2012). The film also stars Aindrita Ray and Rangayana Raghu in the lead roles. It is a remake of the 2010 Telugu film Kalavar King.
 
It is a comedy film and a complete family entertainer. Jaggesh belongs to a lower-middle-class family. He is always under Debt. However, this trait itself will propel him to good acquaintances including his debtors who end up protecting him from even any danger he faces simply to get back their principal amount. Manja quips when asked to give up his ways, and be as his father saying it was a bore to live like a recluse if not his father. The film is shot in Melkote, which is another highlight of this movie. Aindrita & Jaggesh do justice to their roles.

Principal photography commenced in August 2014 in Melkote, Mandya district of Karnataka. Filming process had several delays and took two years for completion. The film was released on 10 February 2017 across Karnataka.

Cast

 Jaggesh as Manja
 Aindrita Ray
 Rangayana Raghu
 Srinivas Prabhu
 Chandrakala
 Mimicry Dayanand
 Bank Janardhan
 Killer Venkatesh
 Srinivas Gowda
 Kurigalu Pradeep

Soundtrack

The film's soundtrack is scored by Giridhar Diwan. His name was recommended to Jaggesh by his brother Komal Kumar. The audio rights of the film was acquired by Anand Audio and the complete album was released on 27 November 2016. Actor Puneeth Rajkumar was signed in to sing a song penned by Yogaraj Bhat. Rest of the songs are written by Ram Narayan and Jaggesh.

References

External links
 Twitter handle

2010s Kannada-language films
2017 films
Indian comedy-drama films
2017 masala films
Kannada remakes of Telugu films
2017 comedy-drama films